Radio Gacko (Радио Гацко in the Bosnian Cyrillic alphabet) is a Bosnian local public radio station, broadcasting from Gacko, Bosnia and Herzegovina.

It was launched on 7 December 1992 by the municipal council of Gacko. The station broadcasts a variety of programs such as music, sport, local news and talk shows.

Programs are mainly produced in Serbian from 08:00 to 15:00. The estimated number of potential listeners  is around 8,061. The radio station is also available in municipalities in East Herzegovina and in neighboring Montenegro.

Frequencies
 Gacko

See also 
List of radio stations in Bosnia and Herzegovina

References

External links 
 Radio Gacko
 Communications Regulatory Agency of Bosnia and Herzegovina

Bileća
Radio stations established in 1992